National Highway 38 (NH 38) was a short National Highway of India entirely within the state of Assam that connected Makum and Lekhapani.

Route 
 Digboi
 Margherita
 Ledo

See also
 List of National Highways in India (by Highway Number)
 List of National Highways in India
 National Highways Development Project

References

External links 
Old NH 38 on OpenStreetMap
 Route map of NH 38

38
National highways in India (old numbering)